Vaxi is a genus of moths of the family Crambidae.

Species

References

External links
Natural History Museum Lepidoptera genus database

Crambidae genera
Taxa named by Stanisław Błeszyński